The Baby-Sitters Club is an American live-action television series based on Ann M. Martin's children's novel series of the same name. The series aired on HBO from January to March 1990, and was produced by the Scholastic Corporation.

Cast

Main
 Meghan Andrews as Mallory Pike
 Melissa Chasse as Dawn Schafer
 Jeni F. Winslow as Claudia Kishi
 Avriel Hillman as Kristy Thomas
 Meghan Lahey as Mary Anne Spier
 Nicole Leach as Jessica "Jessi" Ramsey
 Jessica Prunell as Stacey McGill

Recurring
 Daniel Tamberelli as Jackie Rodowsky
 Gina Gallagher as Charlotte Johannsen

Episodes

Broadcast and syndication
The Baby-Sitters Club originally aired from January to March 1990, on HBO. The series was later rerun on Disney Channel, from early October 1994 to January 1997, and on Nickelodeon.

Home media
All thirteen 30-minute episodes were released to home video.

References

External links
 

1990 American television series debuts
1990 American television series endings
1990s American children's television series
American television shows based on children's books
Disney Channel original programming
English-language television shows
HBO original programming
Television series about children
Television shows based on American novels
The Baby-Sitters Club
Television shows set in Connecticut